Vyacheslav Shevchenko (born 30 May 1985) is a professional Ukrainian football striker who currently plays for FC Dinaz Vyshhorod.

He is nephew of former Ukraine striker Andriy Shevchenko.

Shevchenko is the product of the UFC Lviv School System. He made his debut in Ukrainian Premier League for FC Illichivets Mariupol entering as a second-half substitute against FC Metalurh Donetsk on 25 May 2007.

References

External links

1985 births
Living people
People from Skadovsk
Ukrainian footballers
Association football forwards
FC Borysfen Boryspil players
FC Borysfen-2 Boryspil players
FC Moscow players
Russian Premier League players
FC Mariupol players
FC Stal Alchevsk players
FC Stal-2 Alchevsk players
FC Oleksandriya players
FC Stal Kamianske players
FC Feniks-Illichovets Kalinine players
Ukrainian Premier League players
Uzbekistan Super League players
Expatriate footballers in Russia
Expatriate footballers in Uzbekistan
Expatriate footballers in Malta
Expatriate footballers in Latvia
Ukrainian expatriate footballers
Birkirkara F.C. players
PFC Lokomotiv Tashkent players
FC Viktoriya Mykolaivka players
FC Dinaz Vyshhorod players
Sportspeople from Kherson Oblast